Ben Greenman (born September 28, 1969) is a novelist and magazine journalist who has written more than twenty fiction and non-fiction books, including collaborations with pop-music artists like Questlove, George Clinton, Brian Wilson, Gene Simmons, and others. From 2000 to 2014, he was an editor at The New Yorker.

Books

In 2001 McSweeneys published Greenman's debut, Superbad, a collection of humor pieces and serious short fiction that included several satirical musicals. It has the same title as, but not the same contents as, the popular teen comedy; Greenman engaged in a fake feud with Seth Rogen over the title. The book's cover art was a painting by the artist Mark Tansey. Greenman's next book, Superworse, the Novel: A Remix of Superbad, was published in 2004 by Soft Skull, an independent Brooklyn publisher. It refashioned the book into a novel that was overseen and edited by a man named Laurence Once. Kirkus called it "something extraordinary."

In 2007, Macadam/Cage published Greenman's second collection of stories. It was selected by Barnes & Noble for its Discover Great Writers series, and included both comic work and more serious stories like "In the Air Room," which fictionalized the famous controversy over James McNeill Whistler and the Peacock Room. Elizabeth Gold, writing on SFGate, said that "the best of the stories in this collection are more than funny."

In 2008, Hotel St. George press released a handmade and letterpress-printed edition of Greenman's book Correspondences that included an intricate book casing that unfolded to reveal three accordion books and a postcard. The project was  reviewed favorably by the Los Angeles Times and Time Out.

In 2009, Melville House published Greenman's second novel, which was a fictionalized biography of a funk-rock star based loosely on Sly Stone, Marvin Gaye, Curtis Mayfield, and others. The funk-rock star Swamp Dogg recorded a theme song for the book. Later in 2009, Greenman signed with HarperCollins: the first book announced was What He's Poised To Do, an expanded paperback based on the material from Correspondences. The book was praised by Steve Almond in the Los Angeles Times.

In 2010, Greenman adapted the short stories of the Russian master Anton Chekhov, updating them by replacing their characters with modern celebrities. Pop Matters, praising the collection, said "the very, very best of these stories make us weep."

Greenman's novel, The Slippage, was published by Harper Perennial in 2013. The book included a character who was a chart artist and whose work consisted of meta-charts; Greenman created a number of them and posted them at ILoveCharts.com and McSweeneys, among other places. The New York Times praised the novel as "fluid and commanding."

In the summer of 2016, Little A published Emotional Rescue, a collection of essays about pop music and relationships.

Collaborations

Greenman has also collaborated on celebrity memoirs. His most frequent collaborator has been Questlove; he co-wrote the hip-hop memoir Mo Meta Blues, a food-themed book called Something to Food About, a book about creativity and innovation called Creative Quest, and a conceptual cookbook called Mixtape Potluck. In addition, he wrote memoirs with the funk musician George Clinton and Brian Wilson, co-founder of the Beach Boys, as well as with the actress Mariel Hemingway, Gene Simmons of KISS, and Simon Cowell of American Idol. The Questlove and Wilson books were best-sellers.

Other work

Greenman's journalism and short fiction have appeared in many magazines and newspapers, including The New Yorker, where he worked as an editor from 2000 to 2014, the Paris Review, Zoetrope: All-Story. He has also moderated many events, including Literary Death Match, Literary Upstart, and the National Book Foundation's 5 Under 35 Ceremony.

Personal life

Greenman is married to art director Gail Ghezzi and has two children: Daniel and Jakob (6'2"), both of whom were born when the couple lived in Brooklyn. The family currently lives in Ridgewood, New Jersey.

Bibliography

Novels

Short fiction
Collections

Non-fiction

As collaborator
 
 
Mo' Meta Blues (with Questlove) (2013)
Brothas Be "Yo Like George, Ain't That Funkin' Kind of Hard On You" (with George Clinton) (2014)
Out Came the Sun (with Mariel Hemingway) (2015)
Something To Food About (with Questlove) (2016)
I Am Brian Wilson (with Brian Wilson) (2016)
Creative Quest (with Questlove) (2018)
Mixtape Potluck (with Questlove) (2019)
Unrequited Infatuations (with Steven Van Zandt) (2021)
Music Is History (with Questlove) (2021)

Anthologies
Lost Objects: 50 Stories About the Things We Miss and Why They Matter (2022)
Silent Beaches, Untold Stories (2016)
Flashed: Sudden Stories in Comics and Prose (2016)
When I First Held You (2014)
A Brief History of Authoterrorism (2013)
Unscrolled (2013)
Cape Cod Noir (2012)
Significant Objects: The Book (2012)
Forty Stories (2012)
The McSweeneys Book of Politics and Musicals (2012)
I Love Charts! The Book (2012)
Blue Christmas (2011)
Cassette From My Ex (2009)
Rock and Roll Cage Match (2008)
Stumbling and Raging: More Politically Inspired (2006)
Created in Darkness by Troubled Americans (2005)
The Encyclopedia of Exes: 26 Stories by Men of Love Gone Wrong (2005)
May Contain Nuts (2005)
Future Dictionary of America (2004)
Politically Inspired (2003)
101 Damnations (2002)
More Mirth of a Nation (2002)
Mirth of a Nation (2000)

Essays and reporting
 
 
 
 
 
 
 
  Terry Allen.
  Robyn Hitchcock and Billy Bragg.
 
  Graham Parker
  Small town talk by Shannon McNally and Dr. John.
  Cassie Taylor.
  Marshall Crenshaw.
  Mike Patton.
 
  Mark Mulcahy.
  Tim DeLaughter.
  Glen Campbell.

References

External links
 

1969 births
Living people
21st-century American novelists
American male novelists
American magazine editors
The New Yorker people
The New Yorker staff writers
Writers from Chicago
Writers from Miami
Yale University alumni
21st-century American male writers
Novelists from Illinois
Novelists from Florida
21st-century American non-fiction writers
American male non-fiction writers